IFK Umeå (IFK Umeå Fotboll) is a Swedish football club located in Umeå in Västerbotten County.

Background
The initiative for the establishment of IFK Umeå was first taken on 23 February 1897, but died out after circa six month, and instead the club was established on 6 November 1901.

The club has 9 sections covering  badminton, bandy, bowling, boxing, football, athletics, orienteering, skiing and weightlifting. There are around 2,000 members.

Since foundation, IFK Umeå has participated mainly in the middle and lower divisions of the Swedish football league system. In 1995 they played one season in Division 2 Norrland which was then the third tier of Swedish football. The club currently plays in Division 3 Mellersta Norrland which is the fifth tier of Swedish football.  They play their home matches at the Vildmannavallen IP in Umeå. IFK Umeå has an agreement with Umeå municipality which allows the club to manage the Vildmannavallen.  Next to the facility are the club's offices which are centrally located in the town.

IFK Umeå are affiliated to the Västerbottens Fotbollförbund.

Season to season

Attendances

In recent seasons IFK Umeå have had the following average attendances:

References

External links
 IFK Umeå – Official club website
 IFK Umeå – Men's football club website
 IFK Umeå Facebook

Ifk Umea
Football clubs in Västerbotten County
Association football clubs established in 1901
Bandy clubs established in 1901
1901 establishments in Sweden
Umea